Alexandru Bejan (born 7 May 1996) is a Moldovan footballer who plays as a midfielder for Zimbru Chișinău in the Moldovan National Division.

Club career
Bejan started his career with Dacia Chișinău, where he made his senior debut at the age of 16 in 2012. In March 2018, after Dacia Chișinău were dissolved, Bejan signed for Dinamo-Auto Tiraspol. In August 2018, he moved to Petrocub Hîncești. In September 2021, he joined Zimbru Chișinău on loan.

International career
In March 2021, he was called up to the Moldova national team for the first time.

Honours
Petrocub Hîncești
Moldovan Cup: 2019–20

References

External links

1996 births
Living people
Footballers from Chișinău
Moldovan footballers
Moldova youth international footballers
Moldova under-21 international footballers

Moldovan Super Liga players
FC Dacia Chișinău players
FC Dinamo-Auto Tiraspol players
CS Petrocub Hîncești players
FC Zimbru Chișinău players
Association football midfielders